Caillot v. Deetken, 113 U.S. 215 (1885), was a writ of error filed in the circuit court recorded March 16, 1882, and the transcript that was returned with it was filed in this Court November 28, 1884. Two full terms of the Court had passed between the filing of the writ of error in the circuit court and its return with the transcript into this Court.

This Court can acquire no jurisdiction under a writ of error where the return to it is made by filing the transcript of the record here after the expiration of the term of this Court next succeeding the filing of the writ in the circuit court.

See also
List of United States Supreme Court cases, volume 113

References

External links
 

United States Supreme Court cases
United States Supreme Court cases of the Waite Court
United States appellate procedure
Statutes of limitations
1885 in United States case law